The King and the Girl is a 1925 German silent film directed by Nunzio Malasomma and starring Luciano Albertini, Evi Eva, and Ellen Plessow.

The film's art direction is by Willi Herrmann.

Cast

References

Bibliography

External links
 

1925 films
Films of the Weimar Republic
Films directed by Nunzio Malasomma
German silent feature films
German black-and-white films
Phoebus Film films